Wesley Tuttle (born December 30, 1917, in Lamar, Colorado; died September 29, 2003) was an American country music singer. He was raised in California and took up music at age four, relearning to play the guitar and ukulele after losing all but the thumb and one finger on his left hand. He contributed the yodeling to the "Silly Song" in Walt Disney's Snow White and the Seven Dwarfs, and later backed Tex Ritter on guitar. He married actress Marilyn Myers in 1947 and acted with her in several Western films, in addition to recording the duet "Never" with her. Eyesight problems forced Tuttle into retirement in the 1970s. Wesley's last recording was in 1997, when he sang a verse of Detour on The Old Cowhands CD, "A Tribute to Wesley Tuttle".

Discography

References

1917 births
2003 deaths
People from Lamar, Colorado
American country singer-songwriters
Capitol Records artists
20th-century American singers
Country musicians from Colorado
Singer-songwriters from Colorado